Froedtert Health is a not-for-profit health care system with headquarters located in Wauwatosa, Wisconsin. The system has six hospitals in Wisconsin including Froedtert Hospital.

History 
In 2000, after nine months of negotiations, Froedtert and Community Memorial Hospital in Menomonee Falls, Wisconsin merged to form a new holding company, Froedtert & Community Health. The hospital would be renamed Froedtert Menomonee Falls in 2019.
 
In September 2010, Froedtert Health acquired six ProHealth Care locations in Menomonee Falls, Germantown and Hartford.

See also 
 Froedtert Hospital
 Medical College of Wisconsin

References

External links 
 Official website
 
Buildings and structures in Milwaukee County, Wisconsin
Education in Milwaukee County, Wisconsin
Medical College of Wisconsin
Wauwatosa, Wisconsin
Health care companies based in Wisconsin
Hospital networks in the United States
Non-profit organizations based in Wisconsin